The Federal Correctional Institution, Pollock (FCI Pollock) is a medium-security United States federal prison for male inmates in unincorporated Grant Parish, Louisiana. It is part of the Pollock Federal Correctional Complex and operated by the Federal Bureau of Prisons, a division of the United States Department of Justice.

History
FCI Pollock was constructed between 2005 and 2007. It was built by Flintco, an Oklahoma-based construction company which DiversityBusiness.com listed as the top Native American owned company in 2010.

Notable Inmates (current and former)
The Sentencing Reform Act of 1984 eliminated parole for federal inmates. However, inmates sentenced for offenses committed prior to 1987 are eligible for parole consideration.

See also

List of U.S. federal prisons
Federal Bureau of Prisons
Incarceration in the United States

References 

Buildings and structures in Grant Parish, Louisiana
Pollock
Prisons in Louisiana
2007 establishments in Louisiana